Sylta is a village situated in Upplands-Bro Municipality, Stockholm County, Sweden with 763 inhabitants in 2005.

References 

Populated places in Upplands-Bro Municipality